Kozatske is an urban-type settlement in Kakhovka Raion, Kherson Oblast, southern Ukraine. It is located on the right bank of the Dnieper, separated from Nova Kakhovka on the left bank by the dam of the Kakhovka Hydroelectric Power Plant. Kozatske belongs to Nova Kakhovka urban hromada, one of the hromadas of Ukraine. It has a population of 

During the 2022 Russian Invasion of Ukraine, the settlement was occupied by Russian forces.

Administrative status 
Until 18 July, 2020, Kozatske belonged to Beryslav Raion. As part of the administrative reform of Ukraine, which reduced the number of raions of Kherson Oblast to five, it was transferred to Kakhovka Raion.

Economy

Transportation
Kozatska railway station is on the railway connecting Mykolaiv via Snihurivka and Nova Kakhovka with Melitopol. There is infrequent passenger traffic.

The settlement has road access to Kherson and, via Nova Kakhovka, with Highway M14 connecting Kherson with Melitopol.

See also 

 Russian occupation of Kherson Oblast

References

Urban-type settlements in Kakhovka Raion
Populated places on the Dnieper in Ukraine